Hugh Norman Ross (born July 24, 1945) is a Canadian astrophysicist, Christian apologist, and old-Earth creationist.

Ross obtained his Ph.D. in astronomy from the University of Toronto and his B.Sc. degree in physics from the University of British Columbia. He established his own ministry in 1986, called Reasons to Believe.

Ross rejects both abiogenesis and evolution as explanations for the origin and history of life, contrary to the scientific consensus. Ross' position overlaps with that of intelligent design, but Ross argues that the evidence points to Jesus Christ as the designer, instead of an undefined intelligent designer.

Early life and education
Hugh Ross was born in Montreal, Quebec, and raised in Vancouver, British Columbia after moving there at the age of five.  His parents were James Stewart Alexander Ross and Dorothy Isabel (Murray) Ross.He was interested in science from a young age, often reading science textbooks as a child.

As a teenager, Ross read works by philosophers such as Immanuel Kant and Rene Descartes, but felt their works contained inconsistencies and contradictions. Ross also read Eastern holy books from religions such as Hinduism, Buddhism, and Zoroastrianism. He began studying the Bible in secret due to his family's disapproval. He was inspired by the way the Bible described historical and scientific information, eventually becoming a Christian. 

Ross described his upbringing as moral, but not religious.Ross became interested in astronomy at the age of seven, after asking his parents whether stars were hot when gazing up at the night sky. He visited the local library to find the answer. He soon became convinced that the expansion of the universe and the Big Bang required a divine "cosmic beginner". At 17 he began to serve as director of observations for Vancouver's Royal Astronomical Society and started examining religious texts.

Ross received a provincial scholarship and a National Research Council of Canada fellowship and earned a B.Sc. in physics from the University of British Columbia in 1967, going on to earn a M.Sc. in 1968, and a Ph.D. in astronomy from the University of Toronto in 1973. While in Toronto, Ross began meeting with his fellow Christian students to share their faith.

The National Research Council of Canada sent Ross to Caltech as a postdoctoral research fellow to study quasars and galaxies from 1973 to 1978. While at Caltech Ross met Dave Rogstad and joined his Bible study group, which included his future wife, Kathleen Ann Drake. The group encouraged him to spread his personal story about scientific evidence and Christianity.

Career
Ross served as a minister of evangelism at Sierra Madre Congregational Church. He was encouraged by leaders in his church to start his own ministry, and in 1986 he and Kathy Ross founded the apologetics ministry Reasons To Believe in Sierra Madre, California. 

In 1991, Ross began writing books on Christian apologetics, with his book sales exceeding a quarter million copies.

In 2012, Ross won the Trotter Prize, delivering the Trotter Lecture at Texas A&M University on "Theistic Implications for Big Bang Cosmology."

Ross has made radio and television appearances, and his work has been covered by news outlets including Christianity Today, The Houston Chronicle, The LA Times, The Washington Post, and Fox News. 

In July 2022, Ross stepped down as CEO of Reasons to Believe to focus his efforts on writing and other endeavors.

Beliefs 
Ross believes God has revealed his existence and divine nature through both the Bible and creation. He also believes that his creation model is empirically testable, and equally plausible as the evolutionary model. Ross also believes that the Earth is fine-tuned for life, and that science and Christianity intersect rather than contradicting each other. Ross believes that God has created the universe for a reason and desires a relationship with humans.

Ross believes the record of creation is "like the 67th book of the Bible." He attempts to use science to find common ground with people, including secular scientists who reject the idea of God.

Old-Earth Creationism 
Ross believes in progressive creationism, a view which holds that while the Earth is billions of years old, life did not appear by natural forces alone but that a supernatural agent formed different lifeforms in incremental (progressive) stages, and day-age creationism, a system of reconciling a literal Genesis account of creation with modern scientific theories on the age of the universe, the Earth, life, and humans. He rejects the young-Earth creationist positions that the earth is younger than 10,000 years and that the creation "days" of Genesis 1 represent literal 24-hour periods. Ross instead asserts that these days (translated from the Hebrew word yom) are historic, distinct, and sequential, but not 24 hours in length nor equal in length. Ross agrees with the scientific community that any version of intelligent design is inadequate if it does not provide a testable hypothesis which can make verifiable and falsifiable predictions, and if not, it should not be taught in the classroom as science.

Ross has criticized young-Earth creationists, in particular Russell Humphreys and Ken Ham.

Personal life
Ross married Kathy in 1977 and they have two sons.

Kathy was formerly the senior vice president of Reasons to Believe and oversaw the organization’s communications.

Ross has been diagnosed with Asperger syndrome. He has credited his autism with helping him become an astrophysicist and an expert on celestial bodies.

Bibliography
Ross has written or collaborated on the following books:

The Fingerprint of God. Orange, Calif.: Promise Publishing, 1989, 2nd ed. 1991, 3rd ed. 2005 
The Creator and the Cosmos. Colorado Springs: NavPress, 1993, 2nd ed. 1995, 3rd ed. 2001, 4th ed. 2018 
Creation and Time. Colorado Springs: NavPress, 1994 
Beyond the Cosmos. Colorado Springs: NavPress, 1996, 2nd ed. 1999; Orlando, FL: Signalman Publishing, 2010, 3rd ed. 
The Genesis Question, Colorado Springs: NavPress, 1998, 2nd ed. 2001 
The Genesis Debate, Mission Viejo, CA: Crux, 2002 (with five other authors) 
Lights in the Sky and Little Green Men, Colorado Springs: NavPress, 2002 
A Matter of Days, Colorado Springs: NavPress, 2004 
Origins of Life, Colorado Springs: NavPress, 2004 (with Fazale Rana) 
Who Was Adam? Colorado Springs, NavPress, 2005 (with Fazale Rana) 
Creation as Science, Colorado Springs: NavPress, 2006 
Why the Universe is the Way it Is, Grand Rapids, MI: Baker Books, 2008 
More Than a Theory, Grand Rapids, MI: Baker Books, 2009 
Hidden Treasures in the Book of Job: How the Oldest Book of the Bible Answers Today's Scientific Questions, Baker Books, 2011 
Navigating Genesis: A Scientist's Journey through Genesis 1–11, 2014 
Improbable Planet: How Earth Became Humanity's Home Baker Books, 2016 
Always Be Ready: A Call To Adventurous Faith, 2018 
Weathering Climate Change, Covina CA: RTB Press, 2020 
Designed to the Core, Covina, CA: RTB Press, 2022 ISBN 978-1956112016

Filmography

See also 
 Age of the Earth
 Anthropic principle
 Astronomy
 Biblical cosmology
 Cosmology
 Creator god
 Dating creation
 Fine-tuned universe
 Genesis creation narrative
 Timeline of cosmological epochs

References

External links

1945 births
Living people
Christian writers
Christian apologists
20th-century Canadian astronomers
University of Toronto alumni
Christian Old Earth creationists
Canadian people of Scottish descent
Canadian Congregationalists
Scientists from Montreal
Scientists from Vancouver
University of British Columbia Faculty of Science alumni
Writers from Montreal
Writers from Vancouver
21st-century Christians